Class 313 may refer to:

 313 series, an electric train type operated in Japan
 British Rail Class 313, an electric train type operated in the UK
 Renfe Class 313, a diesel locomotive type formerly operated in Spain

See also
 313 (disambiguation)